The Walnut elimia (Elimia bellula) is a species of freshwater snail with an operculum, an aquatic gastropod mollusk in the family Pleuroceridae. This species is endemic to the United States, and is named after the Walnut River, in Kansas.

References 

Molluscs of the United States
Elimia
Gastropods described in 1861
Taxonomy articles created by Polbot